Pavol Poráč is a Slovak ice dancer who also represented Czechoslovakia. With his partner Viera Poráčová, he is a three-time Slovak national champion and competed at the World, European, and World Junior Championships. He currently works as a coach and choreographer in Canada. Poráč has worked with:

 Allie Hann-McCurdy / Michael Coreno
 Chantal Lefebvre / Justin Lanning
 Joanna Lenko / Mitchell Islam
 Alexandra Paul / Mitchell Islam
 Karen Routhier / Eric Saucke-Lacelle
 Lauren Senft / Leif Gislason

Results  
(with Poráčová)

References 

Slovak male ice dancers
Czechoslovak male ice dancers
Living people
Year of birth missing (living people)